is a monorail station on the Osaka Monorail Main Line located in Toyonaka, Osaka Prefecture, Japan.

Line
Osaka Monorail Main Line (Station Number: 14)

Layout
There is an island platform with two tracks elevated. The platform is sealed in with glass walls and doors.

Stations next to Shoji

	

Osaka Monorail stations
Railway stations in Osaka Prefecture
Railway stations in Japan opened in 1994